Bhadli is a village and former princely state on Saurashtra peninsula in Gujarat, western India.

Village 
Bhadli lies in Jasdan Taluka of Rajkot district. It is situated on a tributary of the Ghelo river.

History 
Bhadli was a Sixth Class non-salute state in the Gohelwar prant of Kathiawar, ruled by Kathi Chieftains. It comprised sixteen villages, with a population of 2,988 in 1901, yielding a state revenue of 16,000 Rupees (mainly from land) and paying a tribute of 1,357 Rupees, to the British and Junagadh State.

It was originally a well known holding of a Chudasama Bhayad of Junagadh, from whom it was conquered in the eighteenth century by the Khachar Kathis, who held it till British period. Most of the Chudasama houses of Gujarat and the Bhal region derive their origin from the Raos (princely chieftains) of Bhadli. Bhadli was subordinate to the Babra thana during British period. Bhan Khachar of Bhadli was a noted freebooter of the later end of the eighteenth century.

References

External links and Sources 
 Imperial Gazetteer, on DSAL.UChicago.edu - Kathiawar
  This article incorporates text from a publication now in the public domain: 

Villages in Rajkot district